SAHDUOO SAXOPHONE Co., Ltd. (SAHDUOO) is the earliest saxophone, mouthpiece development and manufacturing company in Taiwan. The main operations located in Houli, Taichung, Taiwan.

History 
Founded in Taiwan in 1965, producing the parts of saxophones as a primary business and developing saxophone instruments. In 1973, Sahduoo saxophone started studying saxophone mouthpieces and transformed to be a saxophone manufacturing and saxophone mouthpiece R&D company. In the early stage, Sahduoo saxophone relied on a handcrafting method to produce the saxophones. However, the saxophone production in Sahduoo consistently employs the handcrafting method. A series of high-performance saxophones has been created at the same time.

References 

【新聞深一度】一支破百萬　MIT薩克斯風價比精品｜三立新聞台 

高秋萍. 2016.09.08(三立新聞). 不是有錢就能買！台製薩克斯風紅國際

https://www.youtube.com/watch?v=UvAVJJIR92Y&t=3m24s

Companies based in Taichung
Manufacturing companies established in 1965
Musical instrument manufacturing companies of Taiwan
Taiwanese brands
1965 establishments in Taiwan